The 1994 European Marathon Cup was the 5th edition of the European Marathon Cup of athletics and were held in Helsinki, Finland, inside of the 1994 European Championships.

Results

See also
1994 European Athletics Championships – Men's Marathon
1994 European Athletics Championships – Women's Marathon

References

External links
 EAA web site

European Marathon Cup
European
International athletics competitions hosted by Finland
1994 in Finnish sport
Marathon